Ohio's 11th senatorial district has been based in greater Toledo, Ohio and currently consists of about three-fourths of Lucas County. It encompasses Ohio House districts 44, 45 and 46.  It has a Cook PVI of D+18.   Its current Ohio Senator is Democrat Teresa Fedor.  She resides in Toledo, a city located in Lucas County.

List of senators

External links
Ohio's 11th district senator at the 130th Ohio General Assembly official website

Ohio State Senate districts